Jessie Willcox Smith (September 6, 1863 – May 3, 1935) was an American illustrator during the Golden Age of American illustration. She was considered "one of the greatest pure illustrators". A contributor to books and magazines during the late 19th and early 20th centuries, Smith illustrated stories and articles for clients such as Century, Collier's, Leslie's Weekly, Harper's, McClure's, Scribners, and the Ladies' Home Journal. She had an ongoing relationship with Good Housekeeping, which included a long-running Mother Goose series of illustrations and also the creation of all of the Good Housekeeping covers from December 1917 to 1933. Among the more than 60 books that Smith illustrated were Louisa May Alcott's Little Women and An Old-Fashioned Girl, Henry Wadsworth Longfellow's Evangeline, and Robert Louis Stevenson's A Child's Garden of Verses.

Early life
Jessie Willcox Smith was born on September 6, 1863, in the Mount Airy neighborhood of Philadelphia, Pennsylvania. She was the youngest girl born to Charles Henry Smith, an investment broker, and Katherine DeWitt Willcox Smith. Jessie attended private elementary schools. At the age of sixteen she was sent to Cincinnati, Ohio to live with her cousins and finish her education. She trained to be a teacher and taught kindergarten in 1883. However, Smith found that the physical demands of working with children were too strenuous for her. Due to back problems, she had difficulty bending down to their level. Persuaded to attend one of her friend's or cousin's art classes, Smith realized she had a talent for drawing.

Career

Education and early career
In 1884 or 1885, Smith attended the Philadelphia School of Design for Women (now Moore College of Art and Design) and in 1885 attended the Pennsylvania Academy of the Fine Arts (PAFA) in Philadelphia under Thomas Eakins' and Thomas Anshutz' supervision. It was under Eakins that Smith began to use photography as a resource in her illustrations. Although Eakins' demeanor could be difficult, particularly with female students, he became one of her first major influences. In May 1888, while Smith was still at the Pennsylvania Academy, her illustration Three Little Maidens All in a Row was published in the St. Nicholas Magazine. Illustration was one artistic avenue in which women could make a living at the time. At this time, creating illustrations for children's books or of family life was considered an appropriate career for woman artists because it drew upon maternal instincts. Alternatively, fine art that included life drawing was not considered "ladylike." Illustration partly became viable due to both the improved color printing processes and the resurgence in England of book design.

Smith graduated from PAFA in June 1888. The same year, she was hired for an entry-level position in the advertising department of the Ladies' Home Journal. Smith's responsibilities were finishing rough sketches, designing borders, and preparing advertising art for the magazine. In this role, she illustrated the book of poetry New and True: rhymes and rhythms and histories droll for boys and girls from pole to pole (1892) by Mary Wiley Staver.

While at Ladies' Home Journal, Smith enrolled in 1894 in classes taught by Howard Pyle at Drexel Institute, now Drexel University. She was in his first class, which was almost 50% female. Pyle pushed many artists of Smith's generation to fight for their right to illustrate for the major publishing houses. He worked especially closely with many artists whom he saw as "gifted". Smith later wrote a speech stating that working with Pyle swept away "all the cobwebs and confusions that so beset the path of the art-student." The speech was later compiled in the 1923 work "Report of the Private View of Exhibition of the Works of Howard Pyle at the Art Alliance". She studied with Pyle through 1897.

Red Rose Girls

While studying at Drexel, Smith met Elizabeth Shippen Green and Violet Oakley, who had similar talent and with whom she had mutual interests. They developed a lifelong friendship, sharing a studio on Philadelphia's Chestnut Street and working together.  Oakley and Smith illustrated Henry Wadsworth Longfellow's Evangeline, published in 1897. Their teacher Howard Pyle helped to secure this first commission for the two artists.

At the turn of the twentieth century, Smith's career flourished. She illustrated a number of books, magazines, and created an advertisement for Ivory soap. Her works were published in Scribner's, Harper's Bazaar, Harper's Weekly, and St. Nicholas Magazine. She won an award for Child Washing. Green, Smith, and Oakley became known as "The Red Rose Girls" after the Red Rose Inn in Villanova, Pennsylvania, where they lived and worked together for four years beginning in the early 1900s. They leased the inn, where they were joined by Oakley's mother, Green's parents, and Henrietta Cozens, who managed the gardens and inn. Alice Carter wrote about the women in The Red Rose Girls: An Uncommon Story of Art and Love for an exhibition of their work at the Norman Rockwell Museum. Museum Director Laurie Norton Moffatt said, "These women were considered the most influential artists of American domestic life at the turn of the twentieth century. Celebrated in their day, their poetic, idealized images still prevail as archetypes of motherhood and childhood a century later."

Green and Smith illustrated the calendar, The Child in 1903. Smith exhibited at the Pennsylvania Academy of the Arts that year and won the Mary Smith Prize. When the artists lost the lease on the Red Rose Inn in 1904,  a farmhouse was remodeled by Frank Miles Day for them in West Mount Airy, Philadelphia. They named their new shared home and workplace "Cogslea", drawn from the initials of their surnames and that of Smith's roommate, Henrietta Cozens.

New Woman

As educational opportunity opened up to women in the later 19th century, women artists joined professional enterprises, and also founded their own art associations. But artwork by 'lady artists' was considered inferior. To help overcome that stereotype women became "increasingly vocal and confident" in promoting their work, as part of the emerging image of the educated, modern and freer "New Woman". Artists "played crucial roles in representing the New Woman, both by drawing images of the icon and exemplifying this emerging type through their own lives."

In the late 19th century and early 20th century about 88% of the subscribers to the 11,000 American magazines and periodicals were women. As more women entered the artistic community, publishers hired women to create illustrations which depicted the world through women's perspectives. Other successful illustrators were Jennie Augusta Brownscombe, Rose O'Neill, Elizabeth Shippen Green, and Violet Oakley.

Continued career

Smith preferred to create illustrations for covers and stories, and also illustrated advertisements, which bore her signature. Smith was particularly known for her illustrations and advertising posters of children and women, which appealed to millions of people.

According to the National Museum of American Illustration, many say Smith is the "greatest children's book illustrator" and her work has been compared to Mary Cassatt's for her endearing portrayal of children.

Smith was a member of Philadelphia's The Plastic Club (founded 1897), established to promote "Art for art's sake" and to provide a means to encourage one another professionally and create opportunities to sell their works.
Other members included Elenore Abbott, Violet Oakley, and Elizabeth Shippen Green. All the women who founded it had been students of Howard Pyle.

In 1903, the Society of Illustrators elected Florence Scovel Shinn and Elizabeth Shippen Green as its first women members. Smith, Oakley, and May Wilson Preston became members the following year. They were associate members until 1920, when they were made full members of the organization. 

In 1905 she was one of seven leading artists who contracted to work exclusively for Collier's. The others were Charles Dana Gibson, Maxfield Parrish, A. B. Frost, Frank Xavier Leyendecker, E. W. Kemble, and Frederic Remington.

According to The New York Times in 1910, Smith made about US$12,000 ($ today) per year and, like Norman Rockwell and J. C. Leyendecker, became popular as a "media star". 

In 1911 both of her parents and her former teacher and promoter, Howard Pyle, died and Elizabeth Shippen Green married Huger Elliott. Oakley had a major mural project in the Pennsylvania state capitol in Harrisburg that kept her away from Cogslea for extended periods. Smith had a 16-room house and studio that she called Cogshill built on property near Cogslea. She lived in this house, her final home, with Cozens, her aunt, and her brother.

Over the next several years she continued to create illustrations for magazines, including a series of Mother Goose illustrations printed in Good Housekeeping which were black and white until mid-1914 when they were printed in color. Her illustrations were reproduced in the book The Jessie Willcox Smith Mother Goose by Dodd, Mead, and Company. This book, reflecting her continued theme of mother and child in a realistic portrayal, was a commercial success. Biographer Edward D. Nudelman wrote, "The cover illustration for this book, showing two children nestled beneath the wings of Mother Goose, is one of Smith's most pleasing and warm images. The serenity portrayed in the posture and expression of the children, along with the material concern of Mother Goose, gives evidence of the genius of Smith." 

Smith had a knack for painting children, persuasively using milk, cookies and fairy tales to achieve a relaxed, focused, child model. In an October 1917 Good Housekeeping article she wrote that "a child will always look directly at anyone who is telling a story; so while I paint I tell tales marvelous to hear." In 1915 Smith finished one of her most well known work, a series of pictures for Charles Kingsley's The Water-Babies.

She graced every printed cover of Good Housekeeping from December 1917 through April 1933, creating a total of 184 illustrations of family scenes for the magazine. She is the artist with the longest continuous run of illustrated magazine covers. The magazine said of her, "Certainly no other artist is so fitted to understand us, and to make for us pictures so truly an index to what we are as a magazine are striving for. The holding up to our readers of the highest ideals of the American home, the home with that certain sweet wholesomeness one associates with a sunny living-room—and children." 

She was one of the highest paid illustrators of the time, earning over $1,500 per cover. Smith also created illustrations for Kodak and Procter & Gamble's Ivory soap over the course of her career. She made illustrations for Collier's magazines and of Charles Dickens' works, like Tiny Tim, Dickens' Children – Ten Children, and David Copperfield.

Smith continued to create illustrations throughout her life, but she increased the number of portraits she painted beginning about 1925. She used a technique that she learned from Eakins in these later years, using photographs as a tool when creating portraits.

Artistic style
Smith's style changed drastically through her life. In the beginning of her career she used dark lined borders to delineate  brightly coloured objects and people in a style described as "Japonesque." In later works she softened the lines and colours until they almost disappeared. Smith worked in mixed media: oil, watercolor, pastels, gouache, charcoal, whatever she felt gave her desired effect. She often overlaid oils on charcoal, on a paper whose grain or texture added an important element to the work. Her use of colour was influenced by the French impressionist painters.

Most of Smith's work is concerned with children and motherly love. Many reviewers say Smith was continually trying to recreate the image of love she had desperately needed as a child. Smith preferred to use non- professional children as opposed to child actors as models because she found professional children did not have the same soul, or will to explore, as amateur child models. She would invite her friends to visit, and watch their children play, to use as her inspiration.

Death and legacy
Though never a travel enthusiast, Smith finally agreed to tour Europe in 1933 with Isabel Crowder, who was both Henrietta Cozens' niece and also a nurse. During her trip, her health deteriorated. Smith died in her sleep at her house at Cogshill in 1935 at the age of 71. 

In 1936, the Pennsylvania Academy of the Fine Arts held a memorial retrospective exhibition of her works.

In 1991, Smith became only the second woman to be inducted into The Hall of Fame of the Society of Illustrators. Lorraine Fox (1979) had been the first. Of the small group of women inducted since then, three were the members of The Red Rose Girls: Jessie Willcox Smith,  Elizabeth Shippen Green (1994) and Violet Oakley (1996).

Smith bequeathed 14 original works to the Library of Congress' "Cabinet of American Illustration" collection to document the Golden age of illustration (1880-1920s).  Smith's papers are on deposit in the collection of the Archives of American Art at the Smithsonian Institution.

Collections

Her works are in the collections of the following:
 Brandywine Heritage Galleries, Brandywine River Museum
 Delaware Art Museum
 Rare Book Department, Free Library of Philadelphia
 National Museum of American Illustration
 New York Public Library Digital Gallery.
 Pennsylvania Academy of the Fine Arts
 Philadelphia Museum of Art
 United States Library of Congress
 University of Michigan Museum of Art

Works 
Smith made illustrations for more than 250 periodicals, 200 magazine covers, 60 books, prints, calendars and posters from 1888 to 1932. She also painted portraits. Some of her works are listed below.

Illustrations 
 New and True [Poems] – Mary Wiley Staver (Lee & Shepard, 1892)
 Evangeline: A Tale of Acadie – Henry Wadsworth Longfellow (1897)
 The Young Puritans in Captivity – Mary Prudence Wells Smith (Little, Brown & Co, 1899)
 Brenda's Summer at Rockley – Helen Leah Reed (1901)
 An Old-Fashioned Girl – Louisa May Alcott (1902)
 The Book of The Child [Short Stories] – Mabel Humphrey (Stokes, 1903)
 Rhymes of Real Children – Betty Sage (Duffield, 1903)
 In The Closed Room – Frances Hodgson Burnett (Hodder, 1904)
 A Child's Garden of Verses – Robert Louis Stevenson (Scribner US/Longmans Green UK, 1905)
 The Bed-Time Book – Helen Hay Whitney (Duffield US/Chatto UK, 1907)
 Dream Blocks – Aileen Cleveland Higgins (Duffield US/Chatto UK, 1908)
 The Seven Ages of Childhood – Carolyn Wells (Moffat & Yard, 1909)
 A Child's Book of Old Verses – Various Poets (Duffield, 1910)
 The Five Senses – Angela M. Keyes (1911)
 The Now-a-Days Fairy Book – Anna Alice Chapin (1911)
 A Child's Book of Stories – Penrhyn W. Coussens (1911)
 Dickens' Children – Charles Dickens (Scribner, 1912)
 Twas The Night Before Christmas – Clement Clarke Moore (1912)
 The Jessie Wilcox Smith Mother Goose (1914)
 Little Women – Louisa May Alcott (Little, Brown & Co, 1915)
 When Christmas Comes Around – Priscilla Underwood (Duffield, 1915)
 Swift's Premium Calendar (1916)
 The Water Babies – Charles Kingsley (Dodd, Mead & Co, 1916)
 The Way to Wonderland – Mary Stewart (Dodd, Mead & Co, 1917)
 At The Back of The North Wind – George MacDonald (McKay, 1919)
 The Princess and the Goblin – George MacDonald (McKay, 1920)
 Heidi – Johanna Spyri (McKay, 1922)
 Boys and Girls of Bookland – Nora Archibald Smith (Cosmopolitan Book Corporation, 1923)
 A Very Little Child's Book of Stories – Ada M. & Eleanor L. Skinner (1923)
 A  Child's Book of Country Stories – Ada M. & Eleanor L. Skinner (Duffield, 1925)

Magazines 
The major magazines that she illustrated include:
 Saint Nicholas Magazine (1888–1905)
 Ladies Home Journal (1896–1915)
 Ladies Home Companion until 1897, name changed to Woman's Home Companion (1896–1920)
 Collier's (1899–1916)
 Scribner's Magazine (1900–1937)
 McClure's Magazine (1903–1909)
 Good Housekeeping Magazine (1912–1933)

Gallery

Notes

References

Sources
 
 
 
 
 
 
 
 
 
 
 
 
 
 Joniec, Nicole. (2011).  The Jessie Wilcox Smith Collection. Print and Photograph Department of The Library Company of Philadelphia.

Further reading

External links

 
 
 Images and works of Jessie Willcox Smith, Smithsonian Institution Research Information System
 

1863 births
1935 deaths
Artists from Philadelphia
American women illustrators
Burials at The Woodlands Cemetery
American children's book illustrators
Fantasy artists
19th-century illustrators of fairy tales
20th-century illustrators of fairy tales
Philadelphia School of Design for Women alumni
Pennsylvania Academy of the Fine Arts alumni
LGBT people from Pennsylvania
20th-century American women artists
Students of Thomas Eakins